The Revolutionary Communist Group – RCG (Arabic: المجموعة الشيوعية الثورية | Tajammu' al-Shuyu'i al-Thawri), or Groupe Communiste Révolutionnaire (GCR) in French, is a Trotskyist organisation in Lebanon, associated with the reunified Fourth International.

History
The GCR was founded in the 1970s as a full 'section' of the Fourth International. The 2003 World Congress of the International reorganised it as a sympathising group, reflecting a decline in the GCR's membership.

The organisation contributes to International Viewpoint and Inprecor.

Members
Hani Adada (journalist)

See also 
Communist Action Organization in Lebanon (OCAL)
Lebanese Communist Party 
Lebanese Civil War
Lebanese National Movement
Progressive Socialist Party
1982 Lebanon War

Notes

References

Alain Menargues, Les Secrets de la guerre du Liban: Du coup d'état de Béchir Gémayel aux massacres des camps palestiniens, Albin Michel, Paris 2004.  (in French)
Denise Ammoun, Histoire du Liban contemporain: Tome 2 1943-1990, Fayard, Paris 2005.  (in French) – 
Edgar O'Ballance, Civil War in Lebanon, 1975-92, Palgrave Macmillan, London 1998. 
 Itamar Rabinovich, The war for Lebanon, 1970–1985, Cornell University Press, Ithaca and London 1989 (revised edition). , 0-8014-9313-7 – 
 Rex Brynen, Sanctuary and Survival: the PLO in Lebanon, Boulder: Westview Press, Oxford 1990.  – 
Robert Fisk, Pity the Nation: Lebanon at War, London: Oxford University Press, (3rd ed. 2001).  – 
 Marius Deeb, The Lebanese Civil War, Praeger Publishers Inc., New York 1980. 
 Thomas Collelo (ed.), Lebanon: a country study, Library of Congress, Federal Research Division, Headquarters, Department of the Army (DA Pam 550-24), Washington D.C., December 1987 (Third edition 1989). –

External links
Revolutionary Communist Group – Lebanon official page at revolutionarycommunist.org.
Revolutionary Communist Group – Lebanon official page at internationalviewpoint.org. 
GCR communique on Israel's invasion of Lebanon.
Communist parties in Lebanon
Trotskyist organizations in Asia
Fourth International (post-reunification)
Lebanese National Movement
Factions in the Lebanese Civil War